Sidney Bryan Berry  (February 10, 1926 – July 1, 2013) was a United States Army Lieutenant General, Superintendent of West Point (1974–1977), and Commissioner of Public Safety for the state of Mississippi (1980–1984).

Early life and education
Berry was born in Hattiesburg, Mississippi on February 10, 1926.  He received his appointment to the academy from Mississippi, graduating 160th in his class from West Point in 1948. He was commissioned a second lieutenant in the infantry branch, and assigned to his first unit in Japan in 1949.

Military career
Berry's career spanned two wars. He first saw duty as a company commander in Korea. For service during the war in Korea, he was awarded two Silver Stars, a Bronze Star for Valor, a Purple Heart, and the Combat Infantryman Badge.

After duty in the Korean War, he earned a graduate degree from Columbia University (1951–1953). He then served as an instructor at West Point in the Department of Social Sciences (1953–1956). He was a military assistant to Secretary of Defense Robert McNamara (1961–1964), traveling to South Vietnam on multiple occasions. 1964–65, Berry was a student at the U.S. Army War College, in Carlisle Barracks, PA. He also served a year at the Council of Foreign Relations in New York City (1967–1968).

He would serve two and a half years in the Vietnam War between 1965 and 1971. His second combat wound occurred during his first tour (1965–1966) when he was serving as senior Military Assistance Command, Vietnam adviser to the Army of the Republic of Vietnam 7th Division. His awards for his service in South Vietnam included the Distinguished Service Medal, 2 Silver Stars, two Distinguished Flying Crosses, two Legions of Merit, the Purple Heart, 42 Air Medals, and a second Combat Infantryman Badge.

Berry became the 50th Superintendent of West Point in 1974.  His time there would be trying, as he oversaw the integration of women in the summer of 1976 while at the same time dealing with a massive honor scandal involving cheating on an academic test involving the junior class. Following his tour as USMA Superintendent, Berry commanded the V Corps, US Army, Europe, from 1977 to 1980. He retired from active military service on 1 March 1980.

Decorations
   Army Distinguished Service Medal with one oak leaf cluster
   Silver Star with three oak leaf clusters
   Legion of Merit with three oak leaf clusters
   Distinguished Flying Cross
   Bronze Star with Valor Device
   Air Medal with eight silver oak leaf clusters and one bronze oak leaf cluster
   Purple Heart with oak leaf cluster
   Combat Infantryman Badge with second award star

Post military
Upon retirement from the military Berry served as Mississippi's Commissioner of Public Safety, 1980–1984.  He then retired to Pennsylvania.

He died at a retirement home in  Kennett Square, Pennsylvania on July 1, 2013 of complications from Parkinson's disease. At his death he was 87 and was survived by his wife of 64 years, Anne; two daughters, a son and 12 grandchildren.

References

 Sources
 
 

1926 births
2013 deaths
United States Military Academy alumni
Columbia University alumni
United States Army generals
Superintendents of the United States Military Academy
Recipients of the Air Medal
Recipients of the Silver Star
Recipients of the Distinguished Service Medal (US Army)
Recipients of the Distinguished Flying Cross (United States)
Recipients of the Legion of Merit